Dessent Ridge is a mountainous, ice-covered ridge situated 5 nautical miles (9 km) east of Mount Murchison in the Mountaineer Range of Victoria Land. It was mapped by the United States Geological Survey from surveys and U.S. Navy air photos, 1960–64, and was named by the Advisory Committee on Antarctic Names for Joseph E. Dessent, a meteorologist at Hallett Station, 1961.

References 

Ridges of Victoria Land
Borchgrevink Coast